Jerry Ann Ellis is a former American politician in the state of Washington. Ellis served the 14th district from 1983 to 1985. Ellis was a former director of the Washington State Department of Transportation Economic Partners Program, and a congressional staff director in Washington's 4th district. Ellis is a Democrat.

References

Living people
Year of birth missing (living people)
Women state legislators in Washington (state)
Democratic Party members of the Washington House of Representatives
Place of birth missing (living people)
21st-century American women